Kamandan may refer to:
 Kamandan, Hamadan
 Kamandan, Isfahan
 Kamandan, Lorestan